Charles Ives's  Symphony No. 1 in D minor, written between 1898 and 1902, is an example of how Ives synthesized ideas from composers who came before him. Many of his later symphonies relied on Protestant hymns as the main theme.  However, this symphony is composed in the late-Romantic European tradition, and is believed to contain many paraphrases from famous European pieces such as Tchaikovsky's Pathétique and Schubert's Unfinished symphonies and especially Dvořák's New World Symphony.

The piece is scored for 2 flutes, 2 oboes, cor anglais, 2 clarinets, 2 bassoons, 4 horns, 2 trumpets, 3 trombones, tuba, timpani and strings. There is also an optional part for a third flute. The new critical edition adds side drum percussion in the coda of the finale.(Recent recordings by Andrew Litton and Carlos Dudamel include these percussion parts). 

There are four movements:

A typical performance lasts 35–37 minutes.

In popular culture
This symphony is regularly alluded to in Michael Moorcock's 1971 novel A Cure for Cancer.

Discography
In general, since the work lasts about 40 minutes, leaving 40 minutes on a CD, it is usually paired with either No. 2 or No. 4. For example, the Hyperion Records CD by the Dallas Symphony Orchestra conducted by Andrew Litton also includes Symphony No. 4 and Central Park in the Dark. The Naxos Records CD of the RTÉ National Symphony Orchestra conducted by James Sinclair includes instead the "Emerson" Concerto.
 Chicago Symphony Orchestra conducted by Morton Gould (premiere recording, RCA LSC-2893, 1966)
 Chicago Symphony Orchestra conducted by Michael Tilson Thomas (Sony Classical, 1991)
 Detroit Symphony Orchestra conducted by Neeme Järvi (Chandos CHAN 9053, 1992)
 RTÉ National Symphony Orchestra conducted by James Sinclair (Naxos 8.559175, 2003)
 Dallas Symphony Orchestra conducted by Andrew Litton (Hyperion Records, 2006)
 Melbourne Symphony Orchestra conducted by Sir Andrew Davis (Chandos CHAN 5152, 2015)
 Los Angeles Philharmonic Orchestra conducted by Zubin Mehta
 Los Angeles Philharmonic Orchestra conducted by Gustavo Dudamel
 Philadelphia Orchestra conducted by Eugene Ormandy

Symphonies by Charles Ives
1902 compositions
Compositions in D minor